Musconetcong may refer to the following in the U.S. state of New Jersey:

Musconetcong County, New Jersey, a proposed county in the 19th Century
Musconetcong Mountain, a ridge in the Highlands region 
Musconetcong River, a tributary of the Delaware River
Lake Musconetcong, in Sussex County